The surname Penny may refer to:
Andrew Penny (born 1952), British conductor
Benjamin Penny (born 1959), Australian professor
Brad Penny (born 1978), American professional baseball pitcher
Diego Penny (born 1984), Peruvian Goalkeeper
George Joseph Penny (1897–1949), Canadian senator
Glynis Penny (born 1951), English long-distance runner
James Penny (died 1799), English merchant, slave ship owner, and prominent anti-abolitionist
Joe Penny (born 1956), English-American actor
Malcolm Penny, British zoologist and ornithologist
Marie Penny (died 1970), Canadian businesswoman
Rashaad Penny (born 1996), American football player
Scott E. Penny, American politician
Simon Penny (born 1955), Australian artist, a.o.
Sydney Penny (born 1971), American actress
Thomas Penny (1532–1589), English physician and early entomologist
Tim Penny (born 1951), American politician
Will Penny, fictional character played by Charlton Heston in a 1968 western film
William Penny (1809–1892), Scottish explorer of the Arctic, shipmaster, and whaler

See also
Penny (disambiguation)